La Cambrure (The Curve) is a 1999 French short film shot in video, directed by Edwige Shaki who also wrote the scenario. Éric Rohmer was a technical advisor and editor for the movie. Despite being directed by Shaki, some of Rohmer's trademarks, extensive dialog and beautiful young actors, including Shaki herself, are present. 
This short film was the first digital cinema production to be presented in a commercial theater, at the Cannes Film Festival in May 1999.  The short was produced in preparation for Rohmer's feature film  The Lady and the Duke, in which Shaki also appeared.

Summary
As an art student, Roman (François Rauscher) falls in love with an art model (Edwige Shaki) who reminds him of a woman once sculpted by his uncle.

Cast
 Edwige Shaki as Eva
 François Rauscher as Roman
 André Del Debbio as Le sculpteur

DVD release
This short film is paired with Claire's Knee on the Criterion Collection DVD. The story is thematically linked to the 1970 movie - it addresses in a playful way the fetishisation of the female body.

Reception
Tim Lucas of Sight & Sound described the short as "a delightful exploration of art's role in sexual aesthetics and the objectification of desire".

References

External links

French short films
1999 films
1999 short films
1990s French-language films
1990s French films